Emmelmann is a German surname. Notable people with the surname include:

Frank Emmelmann (born 1961), East German sprinter
Kirsten Emmelmann (born 1961), East German sprinter, wife of Frank

See also
Emmermann

German-language surnames